Pseudapistosia leucocorypha is a moth in the family Erebidae. It was described by Paul Dognin in 1914. It is found in Peru.

References

Natural History Museum Lepidoptera generic names catalog

Moths described in 1914
Phaegopterina